The Øregård Gymnasium is a gymnasium in the Hellerup district of Gentofte Municipality in the northern suburbs of Copenhagen, Denmark. The neoclassical main building from 1924 is listed.

History
 
Øregård Gymnasium was founded in 1903 by V. Plockross under the name Plockross' Skole. The building was located at Duntzfelts Allé 8. It received its current name when Gentofte Municipality took over the school in 1919. The current main building on Gersonsvej was inaugurated in 1924. It was designed by G. B. Hagen and Edvard Thomsen. Gehrdt Bornebusch undertook a renovation of the building in 1977–80. The building was listed in 1995.

Principals
 1903-1910: V. Plockross
 1910-1912: Paul Branth
 1912-1927: Jens M. Krarup
 1927-1950: Herluf Møller
 1950-1972: Paul Rubinstein
 1972-1986: Tage Bülow-Hansen
 1986-2000: Lis Holck
 2001-  : Pia Nyring

Notable students
 1924: Aksel Schiøtz, tenor
 1930: Mærsk Mc-Kinney Møller, businessman
 1958: Gregers Algreen-Ussing, architect 
 1985: Thomas Rathsack, former member of jægerkorpset and author
 1986: Frederik, Crown Prince of Denmark
 1986: Prince Joachim of Denmark
 1987: Lykke Friis, politician

References

External links

Gymnasiums in Copenhagen
Secondary schools in Gentofte Municipality
Listed educational buildings in Copenhagen
Listed buildings and structures in Gentofte Municipality
Neoclassical architecture in Copenhagen
School buildings completed in 1924
1904 establishments in Denmark